John Lane Henry (October 18, 1831 – October 21, 1907) was a justice of the Supreme Court of Texas from January 1889 to May 1893.

He served in the Texas Senate during the Thirteenth Texas Legislature, representing Texas Senate, District 6, taking office in 1872 and serving until 1874.

References

Justices of the Texas Supreme Court
1831 births
1907 deaths
19th-century American judges